Cow blowing, Kuhblasen, phooka, or doom dev is a process used in many countries according to ethnographers, in which forceful blowing of air into a cow's vagina (or sometimes anus) is applied to induce her to produce more milk.

Cow blowing was the reason why Gandhi abjured cow milk, saying that "since I had come to know that the cow and the buffalo were subjected to the process of phooka, I had conceived a strong disgust for milk."

Distribution according to Plischke (1954)

Literature 
 Hans Plischke: "Das Kuhblasen. Eine völkerkundliche Miszelle zu Herodot,' Zeitschrift für Ethnologie, Berlin: Reimer, Bd. 79, 1954, S. 1-7.
 H. A. Bernatzik: Zwischen Weißem Nil und Belgisch-Kongo. Wien 1929
 Isaac Schapera: The Khoisan Peoples of South Africa. London 1930
 Tadeusz Margul: "Present-Day Worship of the Cow in India." In: Numen, Vol. 15, No. 1 (Feb., 1968), pp. 63–80
 Florence Burgat: "Non-Violence Towards Animals in the Thinking of Gandhi: the Problem of Animal Husbandry." In: Journal of Agricultural and Environmental Ethics, Volume 17, Number 3 / Mai 2004, Seiten 223-248
 Hubert Kroll: "Das Zurückhalten der Milch bei Rindern und ihre Behandlung bei afrikanischen Hirtenstämmen." In: Milchwirtschaftliches Zentralblatt (1928), Jg. 57, Heft 22, S. 349-350
 Hubert Kroll: "Die Haustiere der Bantu." In: Zeitschrift für Ethnologie Bd. 60, S. 247-248
 Sture Lagercrantz: Contribution of the Ethnography of Africa. Lund: Håkan Ohlssons 1950 (mit Karte zur Verbreitung in Afrika, auch zur Verbreitung des milking with dummy-calves ("Melkens mit Kalbspuppen")

References

External links 
 F. Sierksma: Sacred Cairns in Pastoral Cultures
 Laws relating to animal rights (Indian Laws)

Milk
Ethnology
Cattle
Agricultural health and safety